Muang Saiapoun is a river town in Sainyabuli Province, Laos. It is located along the main road (Route 4), south of Phon Ngam.

References

Populated places in Sainyabuli Province